The Men's super combined competition of the 2014 Winter Paralympics will be held at Rosa Khutor Alpine Resort near Krasnaya Polyana, Russia. The Super-G portion of the race was held on 11 March 2014 and poor conditions pushed the slalom portion of the race to 14 March 2014.

Medal table

Visually impaired
In the visually impaired giant slalom, the athlete with a visual impairment has a sighted guide. The two skiers are considered a team, and dual medals are awarded.

Sitting

Standing

See also
Alpine skiing at the 2014 Winter Olympics

References

Men's combined